Pencey Prep was an American punk rock band from Belleville, New Jersey.

Background 
Before Pencey Prep, two of the members played in local punk bands; Frank Iero from Sector 12 and Neil Sabatino from Stick Figure Suicide. While a student at Rutgers University, Iero was the guitarist and lead vocalist for Pencey Prep. Along with their label-mates Thursday, Pencey Prep was considered part of New Jersey's growing post-hardcore and punk scene, and in 2001, they signed with Eyeball Records. They performed multiple times alongside Nada Surf and one-off shows with Atom & His Package, The Strokes, and New Found Glory among others at New Jersey's 1st Surf and Skate Festival in Asbury Park, NJ. Pencey Prep released their only full-length album Heartbreak in Stereo in 2001 and was released by Eyeball Records. Low attendance during a three-week tour in the Midwest United States and fighting within the band led to the band's demise and by May 2002 the members parted ways.

According to the band's Myspace page, the name is taken from the book The Catcher In The Rye; Pencey Prep was the name of the school that the main character Holden got expelled from.

After Pencey Prep 
Sabatino left Pencey Prep in 2001 and started Fairmont, originally a solo acoustic project; however, McGuire joined on bass shortly afterward. Looking back at the early days of Fairmont, Sabatino notes he "wanted it to be my former band Pencey Prep, I built the band up to being a five-piece with two guitars, keyboards, bass, drums, vocals, and a screamer. That lineup lasted very briefly[;] I had felt in a way that I was [...] trying to write heavy music just to fit in with the rest of the New Jersey scene of the time." From 2004–2007, McGuire played in Fairmont with Sabatino after reconciling and in 2007, McGuire joined Iero as touring bass player of the hardcore band Leathermouth.

Shortly after their 2002 release with Eyeball Records, Pencey Prep disbanded and Iero began playing with the bands I Am A Graveyard and Give Up The Ghost, before landing a spot as rhythm guitarist with My Chemical Romance. He joined My Chemical Romance days before they began recording their 2002 debut album I Brought You My Bullets, You Brought Me Your Love, also released under Eyeball Records. The experience Iero gained from playing live with Pencey Prep, according to Laura La Bella's biography My Chemical Romance "bec[a]me invaluable when the band eventually booked live shows other than basement parties." Keyboardist Simon went on to tour with My Chemical Romance, as well as co-author the 2013 comic-book series The True Lives of the Fabulous Killjoys with Gerard Way.

Members 
 Tim Hagevik – drums
 Frank Iero – lead vocals, guitars
 John McGuire – bass, backing vocals
 Shaun Simon – keyboards, moog
 Neil Sabatino – guitars, backing vocals

Discography 
Albums
Heartbreak in Stereo (2001/2007, Eyeball Records, 2020/2021 Mint 400 Records & B.Calm Press)

Singles
...Trying to Escape the Inevitable. (2000, Riversideriot)
Long Walk to Forever (2000, Self-Released)

List of songs recorded by Pencey Prep

References 
Citations

Bibliography

External links 
 

Musical groups established in 1998
Musical groups disestablished in 2002
Musical groups from New Jersey